Morlocks is an alternative/industrial rock band formed in Gothenburg, Sweden in the early 1990s by J.Strauss and Н.М.Д.

Biography
The first demo cassette They're Not Human, released in 1991, was mostly electronic body music with ambient parts, heavily influenced by cyberpunk and roleplaying games. After two years, the band faded away and was reformed in 1997 with a different lineup. 1998, the demo Through the Waking World was released, this time with a different sound, ranging from guitar based electronic to medieval tunes, orchestral parts and even synthpop. The demo led to a record deal with Nangijala Records, and the debut album ...For Your Pleasure? was released in 2001, containing several reworked tracks from Through the Waking World. Morlocks performed at many Swedish clubs and got a good reputation for energetic live shows, but internal struggles concerning creative disagreements and how the album was mixed ripped the band apart from within. The single Non Trigger Man was released in 2002, and the band was put to an end.

Main composer, lead vocalist and founding member J.Strauss reformed the band immediately after the split by inviting Logos, keyboardist from the recently disbanded death metal band Nightshade, along with Innocentius Rabiatus (the artist formerly known as VigilAnte), ex-guitarist of gothic rock act Dark Side Cowboys. The trio agreed that all earlier releases were way too musically incoherent, and decided to head for a more heavy, industrial rock/metal sound with bombastic orchestral parts (given the fact the all three have a classical music education). The electronic parts would remain, but play a smaller role than before.

In 2010 they performed at the Parkbühne venue at Wave Gotik Treffen in Leipzig, Germany as well as the festival ElektroStat in Oslo, Norway and did a summer tour in Finland along with Finnish gothic metal act Vergil. The album The Outlaw of Fives was eventually self released on CD in 2011 after years of re-recordings, technical issues and long breaks due to a member being abroad for an extended amount of time and the birth of a morlock baby. The lyrics deal with discordianism, political issues, strong anarchistic influences and criticism of several concepts of modern day's society. However, the messages are rarely explicitly spelled out, but instead hidden behind symbolism and analogies, often with tongue-in-cheek play on words.

In 2011, Morlocks was contacted by the German-based industrial rock band KMFDM who had heard some of Morlocks' demo recordings, and after some correspondence a collaboration was started. First out was a Morlocks Mix of Krank, appearing on the Amnesia single (Metropolis Records) in 2012. The song The Mess You Made was co-written by Sascha Konietzko and Morlocks and appears on KMFDM:s album of 2013, KUNST, with lead vocals by J.Strauss and guitars by Innocentius Rabiatus and Jules Hodgson. As of 2013, Morlocks will be supporting act for KMFDM:s upcoming European tour.

After a record deal with German label Echozone in 2012, The Outlaw of Fives was re-released and distributed all over Europe, and an upcoming EP is in the works with some reworked and properly mixed tracks from ...For Your Pleasure? along with some covers and brand new tracks.

Line up

Current members
J.Strauss — Lead vocals, keyboards, trumpet (1990–present)
Innocentius Rabiatus — Lead guitar, backing vocals, keyboard (2003–present)
Logos — Rhythm guitar, backing vocals, keyboards (2003–present)
Lamashtu — Bass guitar, backing vocals (2013–present)

Extra live members
Daniel Bugno — Drums (of Arise)
D.K. — Bass (of Snakeskin Angels)

Former members
Н.М.Д. — Vocals, keyboards (1990–1993)
L.Turtle — Vocals, lyrics (1991–1993)
Napoleon — Keyboards, live percussion (1991–2002)
Jenan — Lead guitar, backing vocals (1998–2002)
I van Ish — Drums, keyboards (1997–2001)
Cavenus — Vocals (2004–2008)
Kya Wolfwritten — Vocals (2009–2010)

Discography
They're Not Human (demo, 1991)
Through the Waking World (demo, 1998)
...For Your Pleasure? (album, 2001)
Non Trigger Man (single, 2002)
The Outlaw of Fives (album, 2011)

References

External links
 Official band website
 Facebook page
 Morlocks on Spotify
 Morlocks on Echozone

Swedish alternative rock groups
Swedish industrial music groups